Southside Historic District may refer to:

Southside Historic District (Birmingham, Alabama), listed on the National Register of Historic Places in Jefferson County, Alabama
Southside Historic District (Valdosta, Georgia), listed on the National Register of Historic Places in Lowndes County, Georgia
Plymouth Southside Historic District, Plymouth, Indiana, National Register of Historic Places listings in Marshall County, Indiana
 Missoula Southside Historic District, Missoula, Montana, listed on the NRHP in Montana
 Southside Historic District (Corning, New York), listed on the NRHP in Steuben County, New York
 Grand Forks Near Southside Historic District, Grand Forks, North Dakota, listed on the NRHP in North Dakota
 Fairmount-Southside Historic District, Fort Worth, Texas, listed on the NRHP in Tarrant County, Texas
Southside Historic District (Racine, Wisconsin), listed on the National Register of Historic Places in Racine County, Wisconsin